Turkey competed at the 2020 Winter Youth Olympics in Lausanne, Switzerland from 9 to 22 January 2020.

Medalists

Alpine skiing

Boys

Girls

Biathlon

Boys

Girls

Cross-country skiing

Curling

Turkey qualified a mixed team of four athletes.
Mixed team

Mixed doubles

Ice hockey

See also
Turkey at the 2020 Summer Olympics

References

2020 in Turkish sport
Nations at the 2020 Winter Youth Olympics
Winter 2020